Panulena perrugosa was a species of air-breathing land snail or semislug, a terrestrial pulmonate gastropod mollusk in the family Helicarionidae. This species was endemic to Norfolk Island. It was first identified and named in 1945 by Tom Iredale; it was extinct by 1996.

References

Panulena
Extinct gastropods
Gastropods described in 1945
Taxonomy articles created by Polbot